The 1971–72 NHL season was the 55th season of the National Hockey League. Fourteen teams each played 78 games. The Boston Bruins beat the New York Rangers four games to two for their second Stanley Cup in three seasons in the finals.

Regular season
Among notable first year players this season were Montreal's Guy Lafleur, who despite scoring 29 goals was felt lacking in comparison to newly retired superstar Jean Beliveau by the Canadiens' faithful; Buffalo's Rick Martin, who set a new record for goals by a rookie with 44; Gilles Meloche, goaltender for the California Golden Seals who acquired him from Chicago; and Ken Dryden, the sensational new goalie for the Canadiens, who despite winning the Conn Smythe Trophy as playoff MVP the previous season was awarded the Calder Memorial Trophy as rookie of the year, on the grounds that he had only played six prior regular season games.

43-year-old Gump Worsley, left unprotected (and unclaimed) in the waiver draft by the Minnesota North Stars, led the league with a 2.12 goals against average.  Less fortunately, Philadelphia goaltender Bruce Gamble suffered a heart attack during a 3–1 win in Vancouver in February and was forced to retire from hockey.

In what was widely seen as a preemptive move to help forestall the incipient World Hockey Association, the NHL announced that Atlanta and Long Island had been granted expansion franchises to begin play in the 1972–73 season.  The bids had been hastily put together in comparison with the 1967 and 1970 expansions.

Milestones this season included Gerry Cheevers setting an NHL record for the Boston Bruins (which has yet to be surpassed) with 33 straight undefeated games.  On February 12, it was Gordie Howe Day in Detroit as his famous #9 was retired.  On March 25, Bobby Hull scored his 600th NHL goal in a 5–5 tie with Boston at the Boston Garden.

An exciting scoring race in which Ranger Jean Ratelle had been leading Bruin Phil Esposito was shortcircuited when Ratelle broke his ankle in a game against California, putting him out for over a month of play.  Ratelle still ended up third in scoring behind Esposito and Bruin Bobby Orr, while his teammates Vic Hadfield and Rod Gilbert – all three linemates on the renowned GAG line—finished fourth and fifth.  A resurgent Frank Mahovlich, rejuvenated by a trade to Montreal, finished sixth, while Bobby Hull, in his final year in Chicago, finished seventh in points and second to Esposito in goals.

Although they had fallen somewhat from their overwhelming offensive dominance from the previous season, once again the Boston Bruins had the best record in the league, while the Chicago Black Hawks topped the West Division.

Final standings

Playoffs

Format change
In response to the prior year when the Minnesota North Stars appeared to intentionally lose games to finish fourth in the West instead of third and avoid a tougher match-up with first-place Chicago, and also the Boston Bruins were "rewarded" for finishing first in the East with a tough series against eventual Stanley Cup Champion Montreal, the first round match-ups were changed so that the first-place team played the fourth-place team and second played third. Previously, the first-place team played the third-place team and the second-place team played the fourth-place team.

This change necessitated a change to the way the semi-final match-ups were determined. Instead of having the winner of the series between the first and third-place East Division teams play the winner of the second and fourth-place West Division teams and the winner of the first versus third-place West Division teams against the winner of the second and fourth-place East Division teams, the semi-final pitted the highest remaining seed in the East Division play the lowest remaining seed from the West and vice versa. 

Despite injuries to several key players, notably leading scorer Jean Ratelle, the New York Rangers beat the defending champions Montreal Canadiens in the first round of the playoffs, with strong play from unheralded players such as Walt Tkaczuk. The Rangers went on the sweep the Chicago Black Hawks in four straight games during the semi-final. Chicago had beaten the Pittsburgh Penguins in four straight games.

Boston easily handled the Toronto Maple Leafs in five games, facing a St. Louis Blues team that had eked out a hard-fought seven-game victory against the North Stars in the quarter-final. The powerful Bruins set a record for the most goals in a four-game series by pounding the Blues 28–8 over a four-game sweep.

Playoff bracket

Quarterfinals

(E1) Boston Bruins vs. (E4) Toronto Maple Leafs

The Boston Bruins finished first in the league with 119 points. The Toronto Maple Leafs finished fourth in the East Division with 80 points. This was the twelfth playoff series between these two teams with Toronto winning eight of the eleven previous series. They last met in the 1969 Stanley Cup Quarterfinals which Boston won in four games. Boston won this year's six-game regular season series earning nine of twelve points.

(E2) New York Rangers vs. (E3) Montreal Canadiens

The New York Rangers finished second in the East Division with 109 points. The Montreal Canadiens finished third with 108 points. This was the tenth playoff series between these two teams with Montreal winning five of the nine previous series. They last met in the 1969 Stanley Cup Quarterfinals which Montreal won in four games. New York won this year's six-game regular season series earning eight of twelve points.

(W1) Chicago Black Hawks vs. (W4) Pittsburgh Penguins

The Chicago Black Hawks finished first in the West Division with 107 points. The Pittsburgh Penguins finished fourth in the West Division with 66 points (winning the tiebreaker with Philadelphia in head-to-head season series 3–2–1). This was the first playoff series between these two teams. Chicago won this year's six-game regular season series earning eleven of twelve points.

(W2) Minnesota North Stars vs. (W3) St. Louis Blues

The Minnesota North Stars finished second in the West Division with 86 points. The St. Louis Blues finished third with 67 points. This was the fourth playoff meeting between these two teams with St. Louis winning two of the three previous series. They last met in the previous year's Quarterfinals which the North Stars won in six games. Minnesota won four of the six games in this year's regular season series.

Kevin O'Shea's series-winning goal in overtime of Game 7 was the first time in Stanley Cup Playoff history that the road team won Game 7 in overtime.

Semifinals

(E1) Boston Bruins vs. (W3) St. Louis Blues

This was the second playoff meeting between these two teams. Their only previous series came in the 1970 Stanley Cup Finals which Boston won in four games. Boston won this year's six-game regular season series earning nine of twelve points.

(W1) Chicago Black Hawks vs. (E2) New York Rangers

This was the fourth playoff meeting between these two teams with Chicago winning all three previous series. They last met in the previous year's Semifinals which the Black Hawks won in seven games. New York won this year's six-game regular season series earning seven of twelve points.

Stanley Cup Finals

This was the eighth series between these two teams with Boston winning five of the seven previous series. They last met in the 1970 Stanley Cup Quarterfinals which the Bruins won in six games. The Bruins made their twelfth appearance in the Finals; they most recently made the Finals in 1970 where they defeated the St. Louis Blues in four games. This was the New York Rangers eighth Finals appearance and first since 1950 where they lost to the Detroit Red Wings in seven games. Boston won five of the six games in this year's regular season series.

Awards

All-Star teams

Player statistics

Scoring leaders

Source: NHL.

Leading goaltenders
Note: GP = Games played; Min = Minutes played; GA = Goals against; GAA = Goals against average; W = Wins; L = Losses; T = Ties; SO = Shutouts

Other statistics
 Plus/Minus leader:  Bobby Orr, Boston Bruins

Coaches

East
Boston Bruins: Tom Johnson
Buffalo Sabres: George "Punch" Imlach and Joe Crozier
Detroit Red Wings: Johnny Wilson
Montreal Canadiens: Scotty Bowman
New York Rangers: Emile Francis
Toronto Maple Leafs: John McLellan
Vancouver Canucks: Hal Laycoe

West
California Golden Seals: Vic Stasiuk
Chicago Black Hawks: Billy Reay
Los Angeles Kings: Fred Glover
Minnesota North Stars: Jack Gordon
Philadelphia Flyers: Fred Shero
Pittsburgh Penguins: Red Kelly
St. Louis Blues: Sid Abel, Bill McCreary, Sr. and Al Arbour

Debuts
The following is a list of players of note who played their first NHL game in 1971–72 (listed with their first team, asterisk(*) marks debut in playoffs):
Terry O'Reilly, Boston Bruins
Rick Martin, Buffalo Sabres
Craig Ramsay, Buffalo Sabres
Marcel Dionne, Detroit Red Wings
Billy Smith, Los Angeles Kings
Guy Lafleur, Montreal Canadiens
Bill Clement, Philadelphia Flyers
Dave Schultz, Philadelphia Flyers
Mike Murphy, St. Louis Blues
Wayne Stephenson, St. Louis Blues
Rick Kehoe, Toronto Maple Leafs
Jocelyn Guevremont, Vancouver Canucks
Dennis Kearns, Vancouver Canucks

Last games
The following is a list of players of note that played their last game in the NHL in 1971–72 listed with their last team):
John McKenzie, Boston Bruins
Ted Green, Boston Bruins
Dick Duff, Buffalo Sabres
Eric Nesterenko, Chicago Black Hawks
Ab McDonald, Detroit Red Wings
Bob Pulford, Los Angeles Kings
J.C. Tremblay, Montreal Canadiens
Phil Goyette, New York Rangers
Val Fonteyne, Pittsburgh Penguins
Bill Hicke, Pittsburgh Penguins
Brit Selby, St. Louis Blues
Don Marshall, Toronto Maple Leafs
Rosaire Paiement, Vancouver Canucks

NOTE: McKenzie, Green, Tremblay, Fonteyne, Selby, Nesterenko, McDonald, Hicke and Paiement would continue their careers in the World Hockey Association.

See also 
 List of Stanley Cup champions
 1971 NHL Amateur Draft
 1971–72 NHL transactions
 25th National Hockey League All-Star Game
 National Hockey League All-Star Game
 Ice hockey at the 1972 Winter Olympics
 1971 in sports
 1972 in sports

References
 
 
 
 

Notes

External links
Hockey Database
NHL.com
Hickoksports.com

 
1971–72 in Canadian ice hockey by league
1971–72 in American ice hockey by league